Polyarc is an American video game developer based in Seattle, WA. The company was founded by Tam Armstrong, Chris Alderson, and Danny Bulla in 2015.

History 
Polyarc was founded by Tam Armstrong, Chris Alderson, and Danny Bulla, with Armstrong as its CEO, in 2015. The company was founded by former Bungie and Rockstar employees with the intention of developing games for VR. The company raised $3.5 million in 2016 to fund the development of its first game, Moss, from Hiro Capital. Ian Livingstone, a former head of Eidos and founding partner of Hiro Capital, joined the board of Polyarc. In 2020, Polyarc raised another $9 Million in funding to finance future developments. This includes the sequel to Moss, Moss: Book II.

Games developed

References

External links 
 

2015 establishments in the United States
Companies based in Seattle
Video game companies established in 2015
Video game companies of the United States
Video game development companies